Numen, plur. numina, is a Latin word typically borrowed by modern languages without alteration. It may mean:

Divinity
 Numen, a divine spirit in ancient Roman religion
 Numen, a divine spirit investing the parents at the festival of Parentalia
 Numen of Africa, a supernatural being seen by Curtius Rufus
 Numen, name applied to Robigalia, personification of agricultural disease
 Numen praesens, the divine spirit of the emperor in the Roman imperial cult
 Numen, a divine aspect of Jupiter Tonans
 Numen, the deity Aius Locutius, harbinger of a Gallic attack on Rome
 Numina, creators of the 27 shrines of the Argei
 Numen, a divine spirit in other religions
 Numen, a classification of Borr in Norse mythology by Finnur Magnusson
 Numen, translation of the Chinese concept ling
 Nine Numina, a group to which the Queen Mother of the West belonged
 Numina, applies to the strungma who offer chinlabs, a type of adhiṣṭhāna in Tibetan and Shingon Buddhism

Philosophy
 Numen, a nation elevated to a divine spirit in the philosophy of national mysticism
 Numenism, another name for animism
 Numina, rejected as impure spirits by St. Augustine in debates with Cornelius Labeo

Gaming
 Numen: Contest of Heroes, a 2010 video game
 Numen, an imaginary power of a sin-eater in the desktop role-playing game Geist: The Sin-Eaters

Literature
 Numen (journal), a bimonthly peer-reviewed academic journal covering the history of religions
 Numen, Old Men, a 2009 book by Joseph Gelfer
 Numina, a class of character in the fictional civilisation The Culture

Music
 Numen (band), a Spanish progressive rock band
 "Numen", a song by Guano Apes on the 2014 album Offline
 Numen Records, a label for Mozez
 Numina, a record label used by Hypnos

Other uses
 Numen Kingdom, a fictional kingdom in the children's animated television series Century Sonny
 Numen International, television production company of Clarissa Burt
 Numina Application Framework, a software product

See also
 Numinous (disambiguation)
 Noumenon (disambiguation)